The men's 200 metre backstroke competition of the swimming events at the 2012 European Aquatics Championships took place May 25 and 26. The heats and semifinals took place on May 25, the final on May 26.

Records
Prior to the competition, the existing world, European and championship records were as follows.

Results

Heats
43 swimmers participated in 6 heats.

Semifinals
The eight fasters swimmers advanced to the final.

Semifinal 1

Semifinal 2

Final
The final was held at 18:01.

References

Men's 200 m backstroke